Louis Zabala (born 25 January 2001), is an Australian professional soccer player who plays as a midfielder for Brisbane Roar. He made his debut in the 2021 FFA Cup against Sydney FC.

References

External links

2001 births
Living people
Australian soccer players
Association football midfielders
Brisbane Roar FC players
National Premier Leagues players
A-League Men players